Nav is a village in Haviq Rural District, Haviq District, Talesh County, Gilan Province, Iran. At the 2006 census its population was 60, in 16 families.

References 

Populated places in Talesh County